The Gibson-Pike-Warrick Special Education Cooperative was a three-county Special Education Cooperative, based in Oakland City, Indiana, that provides education for handicapped and special needs students in Gibson, Pike, and Warrick Counties in Southwestern Indiana. It operated its own system of buses designed for handicapped children and teenagers independently of the school corporations. Starting in 2011, each school corporation, starting with Warrick County began assuming the function of the cooperative, essentially ending it.

It was supported by the following School Districts: 
Gibson County 
Office: 114 N. Grove St. Oakland City, Indiana
 East Gibson School Corporation
 Wood Memorial Jr./Sr. High School
 North Gibson School Corporation
 Princeton Community Middle School
 Princeton Community High School
 South Gibson School Corporation
 Fort Branch Community School
 Gibson Southern High School
Pike County 
Office: 618 East Main St. Petersburg, Indiana
 Pike County School Corporation
 Pike Central Middle School
 Pike Central High School
Warrick County - warrick county pulled out of the coop in 2011
Office: 600 East Gum St. Boonville, Indiana
 Warrick County School Corporation
 Boonville Middle School 
 Boonville High School
 Castle Middle School
 John H. Castle High School
 Tecumseh Junior – Senior High School

Resources
 The Gibson-Pike-Warrick Special Education Cooperative

School districts in Indiana
Southwestern Indiana
Education in Gibson County, Indiana
Education in Pike County, Indiana
Education in Warrick County, Indiana